Bandelier most commonly refers to Bandelier National Monument in New Mexico, United States.

Bandelier may also refer to:

Bandelier Tuff, a geologic formation found in the monument
Adolph Francis Alphonse Bandelier (1840–1914), Swiss-American archaeologist for whom the monument is named

See also
Bandolier (disambiguation)